Stephen Bamfield (born 23 May 1950) is a Guyanese cricketer. He played in twenty-three first-class and four List A matches for Guyana from 1971 to 1987.

See also
 List of Guyanese representative cricketers

References

External links
 

1950 births
Living people
Guyanese cricketers
Guyana cricketers
Sportspeople from Georgetown, Guyana